A triumvirate or a triarchy is a political institution ruled or dominated by three individuals, known as triumvirs. The arrangement can be formal or informal. Though the three leaders in a triumvirate are notionally equal, the actual distribution of power may vary. The term can also be used to describe a state with three different military leaders who all claim to be the sole leader.

Pre-Modern triumvirates

Biblical
In the Bible triumvirates occurred at some notable events in both the Old Testament and New Testament. In the Book of Exodus Moses, his brother Aaron and, according to some views their nephew or brother-in-law, Hur acted this way during the  Battle of Rephidim against the Amalekites. Later, when Moses was away on Mount Sinai Aaron and Hur were left in charge of all the Israelites. In the Gospels as a leading trio among the Twelve Apostles at three particular occasions during public ministry of Jesus acted Peter, James, son of Zebedee and his brother John. They were the only apostles present at the Raising of Jairus' daughter, Transfiguration of Jesus  and Agony in the Garden of Gethsemane. Later, at the time of the Early Christian Church this triumvirate of the leading apostles changed slightly after the former James's death, as it became composed of Peter, John and James, brother of Jesus, known collectively also as the Pillars of the Church.

Ancient China 
During the Han Dynasty (202 BCE – 220 CE), statesmen Huo Guang (d. 68 BCE), Jin Midi (d. 86 BCE), and Shangguan Jie 上官桀 (d. 80 BCE) formed a triumvirate following the death of Emperor Wu of Han (r. 141–87 BCE) and the installation of the child emperor Zhao.

Despite the Three Excellencies—including the Chancellor, Imperial Secretary, and irregularly the Grand Commandant—representing the most senior ministerial positions of state, this triumvirate was supported by the economic technocrat and Imperial Secretary Sang Hongyang (d. 80 BCE), their political lackey. The acting Chancellor Tian Qianqiu was also easily swayed by the decisions of the triumvirate.

The Three Excellencies existed in Western Han (202 BCE – 9 CE) as the Chancellor, Imperial Secretary, and Grand Commandant, but the Chancellor was viewed as senior to the Imperial Secretary while the post of Grand Commandant was vacant for most of the dynasty. After Emperor Guangwu established the Eastern Han (25–220 CE), the Grand Commandant was made a permanent official while the Minister over the Masses replaced the Chancellor and the Minister of Works replaced the Imperial Secretary. Unlike the three high officials in Western Han when the Chancellor was senior to all, these new three senior officials had equal censorial and advisory powers. When a young or weak-minded emperor ascended to the throne, these Three Excellencies could dominate the affairs of state. There were also other types of triumvirates during the Eastern Han; for example, at the onset of the reign of Emperor Ling of Han (r. 168–189), the General-in-Chief Dou Wu (d. 168), the Grand Tutor Chen Fan (d. 168), and another prominent statesman Hu Guang (91–172) formed a triumvirate nominally in charge of the Privy Secretariat, when in fact it was a regent triumvirate that was overseeing the affairs of state and Emperor Ling.

Hinduism
In Hinduism, the gods Brahma, Vishnu and Shiva form the triumvirate Trimurti, where they each represent the balancing forces of creation, preservation, and destruction, respectively. Their female counterparts and consorts, the goddesses Saraswati, Lakshmi and Parvati, make up the parallel Tridevi.

Pagaruyuang
Triumvirates during the Pagaruyuang era in the Minangkabau Highlands were known as Rajo Tigo Selo, or "the three reigning kings." The Rajo Tigo Selo was descended from the same line in the same dynasty and ruled at the same reigning time. It consisted of three kings, the Rajo Alam who ruled the government and diplomatic affairs, the Rajo Adaik who ruled the customs and the Rajo Ibadaik who acted as a Grand Mufti.

Rome

During the Roman Republic,  (or ) were special commissions of three men appointed for specific administrative tasks apart from the regular duties of Roman magistrates.
 The triumviri capitales oversaw prisons and executions, along with other functions that, as Andrew Lintott notes, show them to have been "a mixture of police superintendents and justices of the peace." The capitales were first established around 290 to 287 BC. They were supervised by the praetor urbanus. These triumviri, or the tresviri nocturni, may also have taken some responsibility for fire control. It is possible that they were entrusted by the praetor with the settlement of certain civil processes of a semi-criminal nature, in which private citizens acted as prosecutors. Julius Caesar increased their number to four, but Augustus reverted to three.
 The  ("triumviri of the temple of Juno the Advisor" or "monetary triumvirs") supervised the issuing of Roman coins. Their number was increased by Julius Caesar to four, but again reduced by Augustus. As they acted for the senate they only coined copper money under the empire, the gold and silver coinage being under the exclusive control of the emperor.
 , a priestly body, assisted at public banquets. Their number was subsequently increased to seven, and by Caesar to ten, although they continued to be called , a name which was still in use at the end of the 4th century. They were first created in 196 BC to superintend the  feast on the Capitol, but their services were also requisitioned on the occasion of triumphs, imperial birthdays, the dedication of temples, games given by private individuals, and so forth, when entertainments were provided for the people, while the senate dined on the Capitol. Their number was later increased to seven (septemviri epulones).
 Three-man commissions were also appointed for purposes such as establishing colonies (triumviri coloniae deducendae) or distributing land. Triumviri mensarii served as public bankers; the full range of their financial functions in 216 BC, when the commission included two men of consular rank, has been the subject of debate.

The term triumvirate is most commonly used by historians to refer to two political alliances which occurred in the period of the crisis of the Roman Republic:

 The First Triumvirate of Julius Caesar, Pompey the Great, and Marcus Licinius Crassus, formed in 60 BC or 59 BC as an informal alliance among three prominent politicians and lasted until the death of Crassus in the Battle of Carrhae in 53 BC.
 The Second Triumvirate (the ) of Octavianus (later Caesar Augustus), Mark Antony, and Marcus Aemilius Lepidus, formed in 43 BC as an official, legally established institution, formally recognized by the Roman Senate in the Lex Titia and lasted de facto until the fall of Lepidus in 36 BC, de jure until 32 BC.

Tamil
Tamil Triumvirate refers to the triumvirate of Chola, Chera, and Pandya who dominated the politics of the ancient Tamil country. Sivaperuman, Murugan and Agathiyar are considered triumvirate of Tamil Language and Sangam Literature.

Modern triumvirates
The title was revived a few times for (short-lived) three-headed political 'magistratures' in post-feudal times.

Ottoman Empire
The Three Pashas also known as Ottoman Triumvirate effectively ruled the Ottoman Empire during World War I: Mehmed Talaat Pasha (1874–1921), the Grand Vizier (prime minister) and Minister of the Interior; Ismail Enver Pasha (1881–1922), the Minister of War; and Ahmed Djemal Pasha (1872–1922), the Minister of the Navy.

Modern Bosnia and Herzegovina
Post-war Bosnia and Herzegovina is ruled by a three-member Presidency.

Early-modern and modern France

While French Huguenots had derisively bestowed the name Triumvirate on the alliance formed in 1561 between Catholic Francis, Duke of Guise, Anne de Montmorency, and Jacques d'Albon during the French Wars of Religion, in later years the term would be used to describe other arrangements within France.

At the end of the 1700s, when the French revolutionaries turned to several Roman magistrature names for their newly created institutions, the three-headed collective head of state was named the Consulat (1799-1804), a term in use for two-headed magistratures since Antiquity; furthermore it included an office of First Consul who was not an equal, but the de facto solo head of state and government – a position Napoleon Bonaparte chose to convert openly into the First French Empire in 1804.

Prior to Napoleon and during the Terror from 1793 to 1794 Maximilien Robespierre, Louis Antoine de Saint-Just, and Georges Couthon, as members of the governing Committee of Public Safety, were accused by their political opponents of forming an unofficial triumvirate, pointing out the first triumvirate of Julius Caesar, Pompey, and Crassus which led to the end of the Roman Republic. Although officially all members of the committee shared equal power the three men's friendship and close ideological base led their detractors to declaim them as triumvirs which was used against them in the coup of 9 Thermidor (27 July 1794).

Pre-Independent India
In the early days of the national struggle and before Gandhi, the Indian National Congress was known to be under Lal-Bal-Pal i.e. Lala Lajpat Rai, Bipin Chandra Pal and Bal Gangadhar Tilak, often dubbed Lokmanya Tilak.

Czechoslovakia
The Czechoslovak National Council, an organization founded in Paris in 1916 by Czech and Slovak émigrés during World War I to liberate their homeland from Austria-Hungary, consisted of the triumvirate of Tomáš Garrigue Masaryk as a chairman, Edvard Beneš, who joined Masaryk in exile in 1915, as the organization’s general secretary, and Milan Rastislav Štefánik, a Slovak who was an aviator in the French Army, designating to represent Slovak interests in the national council. During the closing weeks of the war, the Czechoslovak National Council was formally upgraded to a provisional government and its members were designated to hold top offices in the First Czechoslovak Republic.

Indonesia
According to the Article 8 paragraph (3) from the Constitution of Indonesia, there are three head of government institutions that can act as a "temporary" triumvirate only if there are vacancies in the position of president and vice president at the same time (e.g. both president and vice president were assassinated, sick, not doing their duties, passed away, or resigned). They are Minister of Foreign Affairs, Minister of Home Affairs, and Minister of Defense. Those three ministers can act for president and vice president together for maximum 30 days.

After that, during the term of the triumvirate, the House of Representatives through the political parties or the coalition of political parties will elect a new President and Vice President and propose it to the People's Consultative Assembly. The newly elected President and Vice President which holds first and second of the most votes in the parliament will continue the remaining office position of former President and Vice President that were elected from previous general election, not five years.

Modern Israel
 2008–2009: Former Prime Minister Ehud Olmert, Defense Minister Ehud Barak, and Minister of Foreign Affairs Tzipi Livni were sometimes referred to as a triumvirate.
 2012: The leadership of Shas, the ultra-orthodox Sepharadi political party of Israel, was given by its spiritual leader, Rabbi Ovadia Yosef and the Council of Torah Sages, to a triumvirate formed by the convicted Aryeh Deri, who decided to return to politics after a thirteen-year hiatus, the former party leader Eli Yishai and Ariel Atias.

People's Republic of China

Mao Zedong, Zhou Enlai, and Liu Shaoqi are regarded as the three most influential members of the first generation of the Chinese communist leaders. Mao and Zhou managed to remain at the highest levels of power until their deaths in 1976. Unlike them Liu, who served as the Chairman of the Standing Committee of the National People's Congress (1954-1959) and later as the President of the People's Republic of China, nominal de jure head of state (1959-1968), was purged in the cultural revolution in 1968. He died in prison in 1969.

Instead of Liu Shaoqi, Zhu De is sometimes regarded as a member of the triumvirate of the leading Chinese politicians alongside Mao Zedong and Zhou Enlai. The three had the biggest contribution to the victory in the Chinese Civil War and the foundation of the People's Republic of China in 1949 and are now collectively  venerated as the three founding heroes. Mao, Zhou and Zhu were the only three original members of the Politburo Standing Committee of the Chinese Communist Party who remained in the Politburo from 1945 until their deaths in 1976 (though Zhu temporarily lost his membership between 1969-1973) and died while holding the highest party and state offices Chairman of the Chinese Communist Party (Mao), Premier of the State Council (Zhou) and Chairman of the Standing Committee of the National People's Congress, the nominal head of state (Zhu).

Benin

 13 April 1970 until 26 October 1972: After the contentious 1970 presidential elections, the country of Benin (then known as the Republic of Dahomey) adopted a Presidential Council which included the three main political figures in the country: Hubert Maga, Justin Ahomadégbé-Tomêtin, and Sourou-Migan Apithy. In addition, the formal office of President would rotate between the three of them beginning with Hubert Maga. After one successful change of leadership, military leader Mathieu Kérékou staged a coup and overthrew the Presidential Council becoming the leader of the country until 1991.

Soviet Union
See also List of Troikas in the Soviet Union
In the context of the Soviet Union, the term troika (Russian: for "group of three") is used for "triumvirate".
 May 1922 – April 1925: When Vladimir Lenin suffered his first stroke in May 1922, a Troika was established to govern the country in his place, although Lenin briefly returned to the leadership from 2 October 1922 until a severe stroke on 9 March 1923 ended Lenin's political career. The Troika consisted of Joseph Stalin, Lev Kamenev, and Grigory Zinoviev. The Troika broke up in April 1925, when Kamenev and Zinoviev found themselves in a minority over their belief that socialism could only be achieved internationally. Zinoviev and Kamenev joined forces with Leon Trotsky's Left Opposition in early 1926. Later, Kamenev, Zinoviev and Trotsky would all be murdered on Stalin's orders.
 13 March – 26 June 1953: After the death of Joseph Stalin in March 1953, power was shared between Georgy Malenkov, Lavrenty Beria, and Vyacheslav Molotov.
 14 October 1964 – 16 June 1977: After the removal of Nikita Khrushchev in October 1964, the Soviet Union went through a period of collective leadership. Power was initially shared between General Secretary (until 1966 First Secretary) Leonid Brezhnev, Premier Alexei Kosygin, and Chairman of the Presidium Anastas Mikoyan. Mikoyan was replaced by Nikolai Podgorny in 1965.

Modern Italy
In the Roman Republic (1849), the title of two sets of three joint chiefs of state in the year 1849:
 29 March – 1 July 1849: Carlo Armellini (b. 1777 – d. 1863),  Giuseppe Mazzini (b. 1805 – d. 1872), and  Conte Aurelio Saffi (b. 1819 – d. 1890)
 1–4 July 1849: Aurelio Saffi (again), Alessandro Calandrelli (b. 1805 – d. 1888), and Livio Mariani (1793 - 1855)
Almost immediately following the Roman Republic, the Red Triumvirate governed the restored Papal States from 1849 to 1850:

Modern Greece
 After the downfall of the first King of Greece, the Bavarian Otto, on 23 October 1862, and Dimitrios Voulgaris' unsuccessful term (23 October 1862 – 30 January 1863) as president of the Provisional Government, a Triumvirate (30 January – 30 October 1863) was established consisting of the same Dimitrios Voulgaris, the renowned Admiral Konstantinos Kanaris and Benizelos Roufos, which acted as a regency until the arrival of the new monarch, the first "King of the Hellenes", George I.
 A triumvirate was established to head the Theriso revolt of 1905 in autonomous Crete, consisting of Eleftherios Venizelos (later Prime Minister of Greece) in charge of organisational matters, Konstantinos Foumis in charge of finances and Konstantinos Manos, the former mayor of Chania, in charge of military affairs.

 A triumvirate was set up during the First World War in September 1916, to head the "Provisional Government of National Defence" in Thessaloniki. It consisted of the popular liberal statesman Eleftherios Venizelos, General Panagiotis Danglis and Admiral Pavlos Koundouriotis. This "Triumvirate of National Defence" functioned as a collective head of government, although effective control was in Venizelos' hands. With the abdication of King Constantine I in June 1917 and the reunification of the country under Venizelos, the triumvirate was dissolved. The Triandria municipality in Thessaloniki is named after this triumvirate.
 A triumvirate was set up on 13 September 1922 to lead the military revolt against the royalist government in Athens in the aftermath of the Asia Minor Disaster. It was composed of Colonels Nikolaos Plastiras and Stylianos Gonatas, and Commander Dimitrios Fokas. The triumvirate assumed the government of Greece on 15 September, and would control the country until it laid down its powers on 2 January 1924. Plastiras however quickly became the dominant figure among the triumvirate, and was eventually labelled as the "Chief of the Revolution".
 A de facto triumvirate existed during the early years of the Greek military junta of 1967–1974, when the junta's three main leaders were Colonel Georgios Papadopoulos, Brigadier Stylianos Pattakos and Colonel Nikolaos Makarezos. With the increasing predominance of Papadopoulos from 1970 on, this triumvirate ceased to function.
 The Greek People's Liberation Army, active during the Axis Occupation of Greece, had a triadic leadership structure, consisting of the kapetánios ("captain", the unit's leader), the stratiotikós (the military specialist, usually a former Army officer) and the politikós (the political representative of the National Liberation Front).

Argentina 

 First Triumvirate (23 September 1811 – 8 October 1812):
Feliciano Chiclana.
Manuel de Sarratea.
Juan José Paso, replaced by Juan Martín de Pueyrredón on 23 March 1812.
 Second Triumvirate (8 October 1812 – 31 January 1814):
Nicolás Rodríguez Peña.
Antonio Álvarez Jonte, replaced by Gervasio Antonio de Posadas on 19 August 1813.
Juan José Paso, replaced by José Julián Pérez on 20 February 1813, and replaced by Juan Larrea on 5 November 1813.
 Third Triumvirate (18 April 1815 - 20 April 1815):
José de San Martín.
Matías de Irigoyen.
Manuel de Sarratea.
Military Junta (28 June 1966 - 29 June 1966):
 Pascual Pistarini.
 Benigno Ignacio Varela.
 Adolfo Teodoro Álvarez.
Junta of Commanders of the Armed Forces (8 June 1970 - 18 June 1970):
 Pedro Alberto José Gnavi, President.
 Carlos Alberto Rey.
 Alejandro Lanusse.
Junta of Commanders of the Armed Forces (23 March 1971 - 26 March 1971): 
 Alejandro Lanusse, President.
 Pedro Alberto José Gnavi.
 Carlos Alberto Rey.
Military Junta (24 March 1976 - 29 March 1976): 
 Jorge Rafael Videla.
 Emilio Eduardo Massera.
 Orlando Ramón Agosti.

Brazil 

  The Empire of Brazil had two triumvirates during a period known as the Regency period:
 Provisional Triumviral Regency (7 April 1831 – 3 May 1831)
 Francisco de Lima e Silva
 Nicolau Pereira de Campos Vergueiro
 The Marquis of Caravelas
 Permanent Triumviral Regency (17 June 1831 – 12 October 1835)
 Francisco de Lima e Silva 
 The Marquis of Monte Alegre (from 18 June)
 João Bráulio Muniz (from 18 June)

  Republican Brazil had two military juntas:
 The Military Junta of 1930, after the fall of the First Brazilian Republic (24 October 1930 – 3 November 1930)
 General Augusto Tasso Fragoso (Army)
 Admiral Isaías de Noronha (Navy)
 General João de Deus Mena Barreto (Army)
 The Military Junta of 1969, during the military dictatorship (31 August 1969 – 30 October 1969)
 General Aurélio de Lira Tavares (Army)
 General Márcio Melo (Air Force)
 Admiral Augusto Rademaker (Navy)

The Americas 

  Venezuela: by decree of the Caracas Junta and ratified in the Federal Constitution of 1811 the executive power was vested in "three individuals" (1810–12)
  The Eastern State of Uruguay had one triumvirate in 1853.
  The United Provinces of New Granada, now Colombia, and Panama, were headed by two triumvirates in the period known as the "Patria Boba" or Foolish Fatherland
 Interim Triumvirate, 5 October – 23 November 1814
 José María del Castillo y Rada
 José Joaquín Camacho
 José Fernández Madrid
 Triumvirate of the United Provinces of New Granada, 23 November 1814 – October 1815
 Custodio García Rovira
 Antonio Villavicencio, replaced Rovira during his second term as he could not preside over
 José Manuel Restrepo, was never sworn in.
 José Miguel Pey de Andrade, replaced Restrepo as he declined. 28 July 1815
 Manuel Rodríguez Torices
  The Dominican Republic had two triumvirates, which were essentially three-member juntas:
 29 May – 22 August 1866 – 1st Triumvirate (in rebellion against Buenaventura Báez from 1 May 1866):
 Pedro Antonio Pimentel  (b. 1830 – d. 1874; formerly one of three "Generals-in-Chief" 23–24 January 1865)
 Gregorio Luperón (b. 1839 – d. 1897) PA
 Federico de Jesús García
 26 September 1963 – 25 April 1965 – 2nd Triumvirate:
 Emilio de los Santos (b. 1903 – 22 December 1963) (chairman from 29 December 1963, succeeded by Donald Reid Cabral, b. 1923, UCN,  new chairman)
 Manuel Enrique Tavares Espaillat (b. 1924 - d. 1984)
 Ramón Tapia Espinal (b. 1926 – d. 2002)
 : the political arrangement of "three men in a room", consisting of the Governor, Speaker of the New York State Assembly, and the Majority Leader of the New York State Senate
  Nicaragua (1972–74) Liberal-Conservative Junta of Roberto Martínez, Alfonso Lovo Cordero (liberals) and Fernando Agüero (conservative). Agüero resigned in 1973 and Edmundo Paguada was successor.
  (1823–24) Guadalupe Victoria, Nicolás Bravo and Celestino Negrete.

Other triumvirates
The word has been used as a term of convenience, though not an official title, for other groups of three in a similar position:
 Great Triumvirate (19th-century American politics – Henry Clay, Daniel Webster, and John C. Calhoun)
 Bourbon Triumvirate (19th-century American politics – Joseph E. Brown, Alfred H. Colquitt, and John Brown Gordon)
 After the Lisbon Treaty came into force from 1 December 2009:
 President of the European Council - Charles Michel
 President of the European Commission - Ursula von der Leyen
 High Representative of the Union for Foreign Affairs and Security Policy - Josep Borrell
 Great Triumvirate (Early 20th-century golf – Harry Vardon, James Braid, and J.H. Taylor)
 Eric Schmidt, CEO of Google has referred to himself, along with founders Larry Page and Sergey Brin as part of a triumvirate, stating, "This triumvirate has made an informal deal to stick together for at least 20 years".

See also
 Constitution of the Roman Republic
 Council of Three (disambiguation)
 Decemvirate
 Diarchy
 Duumviri
 European troika
 Monarchy
 Septemvir
 Tetrarchy

Notes

References
 Beck, Mansvelt. (1986). "The Fall of Han," in The Cambridge History of China: Volume I: the Ch'in and Han Empires, 221 B.C. – A.D. 220. Edited by Denis Twitchett and Michael Loewe. Cambridge: Cambridge University Press. .
 
 Loewe, Michael. (1986). "The Former Han Dynasty," in The Cambridge History of China: Volume I: the Ch'in and Han Empires, 221 B.C. – A.D. 220, 103–222. Edited by Denis Twitchett and Michael Loewe. Cambridge: Cambridge University Press. .
  Etymology on line
 World Statesmen here Greece - see under each present country

External links
 Livius.org: Triumvir

Heads of government
Collective heads of state
+
Power sharing
Forms of government